Hami Tin Bhai (also Haami Teen Bhai) is a Nepali action, comedy film directed by Shiva Regmi. The film features three of biggest superstars of late 90s and 2000s era- Rajesh Hamal, Shree Krishna Shrestha and Nikhil Upreti in the lead roles supported by Rekha Thapa, Jharana Thapa, Nandita KC, Keshab Bhattrai, Sushila Rayamajhi, Ravi Giri etc. The movie praised by critics with many critics highlighting its screenplay, music, comedy and the actors' performance especially of its lead actors but over the top action scenes were criticized. The movie broke all the records at the records at the box office and was recorded as an  "All Time Blockbuster" at the box office and is one of the highest-grossing films in Nepali film history. It is considered a classic movie by fans.

Plot
The movie opens with an orphan boy called Hari, who earns his living by stealing shoes in temples and reselling them and begging. He meets two orphan boys, Ram and Laxman he adopts them as his brothers as he feels sorry for them. To ensure that Ram and Laxman receive a good education, he leaves his life of crime and works honestly.

After few years, all three brothers are grown up. But it was found laxman was son of rich businessman  who was murdered by group of bandits. Now, the wife of rich man i.e. laxman's mother requests laxman to come back home. He refuses at first but lastly he agrees and he is taken to his real mother. He now starts living a life of businessman but there he founds that bandits who killed his father are now trying to kill him and his mother as well to take away all the property. So he seeks help from his past brothers: Hari and Ram. They jointly fight those bandits and started to live happy family again in laxman's house.

Cast
 Rajesh Hamal as Hari
 Shree Krishna Shrestha as Ram
 Nikhil Upreti as Laxman
 Jharana Thapa as Pooja
 Rekha Thapa as Maiya
 Sushila Rayamajhi as Laxman's Mother
 Nandita Kc as Asmi
 Sunil Dutt as JK
 Sushil Pokhrel as JK father
 Rabi Giri as Pooja father
 Salon Basnet as young Hari
 Dinesh as Gapal
 Manga as Depak
 Prakash Subedi as Doctor

References

External links
 
About hami teen bhai in reelnepal 

Nepalese romantic comedy films
Nepalese action films
Nepalese coming-of-age films